Antoine Ghonda Mangalibi (born February 19, 1965) was the foreign minister of the Democratic Republic of the Congo from June 30, 2003, until July 23, 2004.

Ghonda was born in Leuven, Belgium, and grew up in the Bas Congo province of the Democratic Republic of the Congo, which was then known as Zaire. He did university studies in the United States, and earned a B.A. degree in International Relations from Florida International University in 1992.  From 1992 to 2000, he worked in his family's businesses, and developed a lucrative career in international trade.  He took a keen interest in politics during these years, but did not align himself politically during the late years of the Mobutu Sese Seko presidency, nor during the early part of the presidency of Laurent-Désiré Kabila.

In 2000, however, he plunged into politics, joining the Congolese Liberation Movement, a rebel group led by Jean-Pierre Bemba. In 2003, the Congolese Liberation Movement made peace with the national government led by Joseph Kabila and joined a transitional government in which there were four vice-presidents, including two heading major rebel groups. Bemba became one of the vice-presidents and was given the power to appoint the foreign minister. Ghonda was given the post.

In July 2004 Bemba demanded that Ghonda be sacked, and President Kabila was forced to oblige. Although there was active speculation in Kinshasa's newspapers about the reasons for Bemba's demand, there was not a consensus, and several reasons were advanced. They included Ghonda's criticism of troops from Rwanda and Uganda operating on Congolese soil, Ghonda's friendship with Joseph Kabila, and the mentioning of Ghonda by George W. Bush as one of the three pillars of the new Congo, with Bemba not being mentioned.

After losing the confidence of Bemba, however, Ghonda became more influential with President Kabila.  In the cabinet reshuffle of March 7, 2005, Ghonda was named as one of two roving ambassadors (ambassadeurs itinérants) for the Congolese President.  In the 2006 legislative elections, Ghonda was elected to a seat in National Assembly, representing a district in Bas-Congo province whose main town is Kisantu. The Foundation Antoine Ghonda in this town is a leading source of socio-economic development in the area.

References

1965 births
Living people
Government ministers of the Democratic Republic of the Congo
Movement for the Liberation of the Congo politicians
People from Kongo Central
Florida International University alumni
Democratic Republic of the Congo businesspeople
21st-century Democratic Republic of the Congo people